Chris Christensen (born 2 March 1988) is a Danish swimmer. He competed at the 2008 Summer Olympics in the 200 m medley and 200 m breaststroke events and finished in 32nd and 33rd place, respectively.

References

1988 births
Olympic swimmers of Denmark
Swimmers at the 2008 Summer Olympics
Living people
Danish male breaststroke swimmers
Danish male medley swimmers